Patrick Beardsley Shea (June 28, 1939 – May 23, 2013) was a professional American football player who played guard for four seasons for the San Diego Chargers in the American Football League (AFL).

Shea was born in La Jolla, California. Attended Mission Bay High School, graduating in 1958. Pat Shea was a 3 sport athlete at Mission Bay, excelling in football, wrestling and Track and Field. In 1958 he was the City League champion in the shot put, hitting a then school record of 55'09.25.

References

1939 births
2013 deaths
American football offensive guards
San Diego Chargers players
USC Trojans football players
Players of American football from San Diego
American Football League players